Ängbyplan metro station, formerly known as Färjestadsvägen metro station, is a station on the Green line of the Stockholm metro. It is located in the district of Södra Ängby, which is part of the borough of Bromma in the west of the city of Stockholm. The station is above ground and has a single island platform, with access from the underpass taking Färjestadsvägen under the line. The distance to Slussen is 12.4 km (7.705 miles).

The station lies on the route of a line known as the  that formerly linked Alvik and Islandstorget. The Ängbybanan was designed and built for use by the future metro, but was operated from 1944 as part of line 11 of the Stockholm tramway. Ängbyplan station was inaugurated as part of the metro on 26 October 1952 with the conversion of the Ängbybanan and its extension to form the metro line between Hötorget and Vällingby. It was called Färjestadsvägen until 1961.

Gallery

References

Green line (Stockholm metro) stations
Railway stations opened in 1952